The 1939 All-SEC football team consists of American football players selected to the All-Southeastern Conference (SEC) chosen by various selectors for the 1939 college football season. Tennessee won the conference.

All-SEC selections

Ends
Ken Kavanaugh, LSU (College Football Hall of Fame) (AP-1, UP-1)
Bob Ison, Georgia Tech (AP-1, UP-1)
Ralph Wenzel, Tulane (AP-2, UP-2)
Buddy Elrod, Miss. St. (AP-2)
Ed Cifers, Tennessee (UP-2)
Hal Newman, Alabama (AP-3)
McCubbin, Kentucky (AP-3)

Tackles
Harley McCollum, Tulane (AP-1, UP-1)
Abe Shires, Tennessee (AP-1, UP-2)
John Eibner, Kentucky (AP-2, UP-1)
Clark Goff, Florida (AP-3, UP-2)
Fred Davis, Alabama (AP-2)
Walter Merrill, Alabama (AP-3)

Guards
Ed Molinski, Tennessee (College Football Hall of Fame) (AP-1, UP-2)
Bob Suffridge, Tennessee (College Football Hall of Fame) (AP-2, UP-1)
Milton Howell, Auburn (AP-2, UP-1)
John W. Goree, LSU (AP-1)
Cavette, Georgia Tech (AP-3, UP-2)
Tommy O'Boyle, Tulane (AP-3)

Centers
Cary Cox, Alabama (UP-1)
James Rike, Tennessee (AP-1)
Autrey, Ole Miss (AP-3, UP-2)
Goolsby, Miss. St. (AP-2)

Quarterbacks
George Cafego, Tennessee (College Football Hall of Fame) (AP-1, UP-1)
Sam Bartholomew, Tennessee (AP-2)
Schneller, Ole Miss (UP-2)
Murphy, Georgia Tech (AP-3)

Halfbacks
Bob "Jitterbug" Kellogg, Tulane (AP-1, UP-1)
Doc Plunkett, Vanderbilt (AP-3, UP-1)
Bob Foxx, Tennessee (AP-1)
John Hovious, Ole Miss (AP-2)
McGowen, Auburn (AP-2)
Harvey Johnson, Miss. St. (UP-2)
Jimmy Nelson, Alabama (UP-2)
Nix, Miss. St. (AP-3)

Fullbacks
Howard Ector, Georgia Tech (AP-2, UP-1)
Bill Schneller, Ole Miss (AP-1)
Fordham, Georgia (UP-2)
Golden, Tulane (AP-3)

Key

AP = Associated Press

UP = United Press.

Bold = Consensus first-team selection by both AP and UP

See also
1939 College Football All-America Team

References

All-SEC
All-SEC football teams